Dimona railway station (Takhanat HaRakevet Dimona) is a train station in Dimona, Israel, opened in 2005.

It is on a  line between Dimona and Beersheba, a separate operating line within Israel Railways. The track carries on beyond the actual town itself to mines and freight yards.

Partly due to the station's distance from central Dimona, ridership is very low. With only 14,745 passengers recorded in 2019, the station was the least used in all of Israel. However, proposals to close it on account of poor usage have been rejected in order to preserve passenger rail service to the historically deprived development town.

References

Railway stations in Southern District (Israel)
Railway stations opened in 2005
2005 establishments in Israel
Railway Station